Gabela is a town, with a population of 116,903 (2014), and a commune, named Gabela Sede, in the municipality of Amboim, province of Cuanza Sul, Angola and the seat of that municipality. The area of the  commune comprises 459 km2 with a population of 184,723. It was founded as N'Guebela on September 28, 1907.

Around the town, some areas of the Angolan Scarp savanna and woodlands with its unique plants and animals are still to be found. The Gabela akalat (Sheppardia gabela), a species of bird, was first recorded here by scientists and subsequently named after the town, as were the Gabela helmet-shrike (Prionops gabela) and Gabela bush-shrike (Laniarius amboimensis); these endangered species are only found in the uplands near Gabela.

Mining and transport 
Gabela used to have a mine with a  narrow gauge railway to Porto Amboim.

References 

Populated places in Cuanza Sul Province
Communes in Cuanza Sul Province